Hydroxytibolone may refer to:

 3α-Hydroxytibolone
 3β-Hydroxytibolone